Jack Mahony (born 12 November 2001) is an Australian rules footballer who plays for the North Melbourne Football Club in the Australian Football League (AFL). He was recruited with the 34th draft pick in the 2019 AFL draft.

Early football
Mahony played football for the Sandringham Dragons in the NAB League for two seasons. He also played for Vic Metro in the AFL Under 18 Championships for two seasons, as well as for his school side at St Kevin's College, Melbourne.

AFL career
Mahony debuted in North Melbourne's four point loss against the Hawthorn Hawks in the fourth round of the 2020 AFL season. He collected 8 disposals and one tackle on debut.

Statistics
 Statistics are correct to the end of 2020

|- style="background-color: #EAEAEA"
! scope="row" style="text-align:center" | 2020
|style="text-align:center;"|
| 35 || 10 || 3 || 2 || 28 || 56 || 84 || 12 || 26 || 0.3 || 0.2 || 2.8 || 5.6 || 8.4 || 1.2 || 2.6 
|- style="background:#EAEAEA; font-weight:bold; width:2em"
| scope="row" text-align:center class="sortbottom" colspan=3 | Career
| 10
| 3
| 2
| 28
| 56
| 84
| 12
| 26
| 0.3
| 0.2
| 2.8
| 5.6
| 8.4
| 1.2
| 2.6
|}

References

External links

2001 births
Living people
North Melbourne Football Club players
Australian rules footballers from Melbourne
Sandringham Dragons players